This is a round-up of the 2004 Leitrim Senior Football Championship. Annaduff claimed their first title in 76 years after a narrow win over another Southern side, Gortlettragh, in the final. They had dethroned St. Mary's of Carrick previously in the semi-final.

Group stages
The Championship was contested by 20 teams, divided into four groups of five. The top two sides in each group advanced to the quarter-finals.

Group A

Group B

Group C

Group D

Quarter finals

Semi-finals

Leitrim Senior Football Championship Final

Championship statistics

Top scorers

Miscellaneous
 Annaduff claimed their first title in 76 years.

References
 |Co. Leitrim GAA Website - Championship 2004

Leitrim Senior Football Championship
Leitrim Senior Football Championship